In mathematics, the Jacobi–Anger expansion (or Jacobi–Anger identity) is an expansion of exponentials of trigonometric functions in the basis of their harmonics. It is useful in physics (for example, to convert between plane waves and cylindrical waves), and in signal processing (to describe FM signals). This identity is named after the 19th-century mathematicians Carl Jacobi and Carl Theodor Anger.

The most general identity is given by:

Using the relation  valid for integer , the expansion becomes:

Real-valued expressions
The following real-valued variations are often useful as well:

See also
 Plane wave expansion

Notes

References

External links 
 

Special functions
Mathematical identities